Idiocerus is a large genus of homopteran bugs belonging to the family Cicadellidae (the leafhoppers). The group is characterized by a very short and broadly rounded vertex (head); many species are very similar and difficult to identify. Most are found on specific host plants, particularly poplars and willows. For instance the common European species I. vitreus is found exclusively on certain poplars.

Species 
Species include:

Holarctic species

Idiocerus stigmaticalis

European species

Idiocerus aaliensis
Idiocerus affinis
Idiocerus albicans]
Idiocerus confusus
Idiocerus distinguendus
Idiocerus elegans
Idiocerus fulgidus
Idiocerus herrichii
Idiocerus humilis
Idiocerus lambertiei
Idiocerus laminatus
Idiocerus lituratus
Idiocerus maculicollis
Idiocerus nitidissimus
Idiocerus poecilus
Idiocerus populi
Idiocerus ribauti
Idiocerus rutilans
Idiocerus salgiris
Idiocerus similis
Idiocerus tremulae
Idiocerus ustulatus
Idiocerus vicinus
Idiocerus vitreus
Idiocerus vittifrons

Nearctic species

Idiocerus albolinea
Idiocerus alternatus
Idiocerus amabilis
Idiocerus apache
Idiocerus aureus
Idiocerus balli
Idiocerus cabottii
Idiocerus canae
Idiocerus carolina
Idiocerus catalinus
Idiocerus cedrus
Idiocerus cephalicus
Idiocerus cinctus
Idiocerus cognatus
Idiocerus couleanus
Idiocerus delongi
Idiocerus depictus
Idiocerus distinctus
Idiocerus duzeei
Idiocerus ensiger
Idiocerus exilus
Idiocerus femoratus
Idiocerus formosus
Idiocerus freytagi
Idiocerus gillettei
Idiocerus immaculatus
Idiocerus indistinctus
Idiocerus inebrius
Idiocerus interruptus
Idiocerus iodes
Idiocerus lachrymalis
Idiocerus lucidae
Idiocerus lunaris
Idiocerus maximus
Idiocerus midas
Idiocerus moniliferae
Idiocerus morosus
Idiocerus musteus
Idiocerus nervatus
Idiocerus obispanus
Idiocerus obsoletus
Idiocerus obstinatus
Idiocerus omani
Idiocerus pallidus
Idiocerus pericallis
Idiocerus perplexus
Idiocerus productus
Idiocerus pyramidatus
Idiocerus ramentosus
Idiocerus raphus
Idiocerus rotundens
Idiocerus rufus
Idiocerus setaceus
Idiocerus snowi
Idiocerus striola
Idiocerus subnitens
Idiocerus suturalis
Idiocerus tahotus
Idiocerus taiga
Idiocerus taxodium
Idiocerus texanus
Idiocerus tonotonus
Idiocerus unicolor
Idiocerus vanduzeei
Idiocerus varians
Idiocerus venosus
Idiocerus verticis
Idiocerus xanthiops

External links
Fauna Europaea
Nomina Insecta Nearctica
Checklist of UK Recorded Cicadellidae

Cicadellidae genera
Eurymelinae